This is a list of episodes from in British animated television series Angelina Ballerina. The series aired 20 episodes (39 segments) over two seasons during 2001–03, plus three specials.

Series overview

Episodes
Each episode typically contains a pair of independent stories followed by a brief live-action "Little Stars" segment featuring real ballet students illustrating a particular aspect of ballet performance.

Series 1 (2001–2002)

Series 2 (2003)

Films (2004–2006)

Lists of British animated television series episodes
Lists of British children's television series episodes